Young, Famous & African is a Netflix original first African reality television series, starring African stars Khanyi Mbau, 
Annie Macaulay-Idibia, Zari Hassan, Diamond Platnumz, Andile Ncube, Swanky Jerry, Naked DJ, Nadia Nakai, Kayleigh Schwark and 2Baba. The show focused on building careers, looking for love, and rekindling old flames of famous media personalities from South Africa, Zimbabwe, Nigeria, Uganda and Tanzania.

The series premiered on 18 March  2022.

Plot
The show follows a group of friends who are African entertainers and A-listers as they go about their lives having fun, flirting and fighting in Johannesburg, South Africa.

They hail from five African countries. South African actress and media personality Khanyi Mbau is the central character of the group who is in a relationship with a Zimbabwean businessman. Separated couple Diamond Platnumz from Tanzania and his ex-girlfriend, South African-based Ugandan businesswoman Zari Hassan navigate their post-separation relationship, moving on and co-parenting.

Nigerian model Annie Macaulay-Idibia and her musician husband 2Baba deal with issues of previous infidelity and restoration. Nigerian fashion stylist Swanky Jerry is another central character who often appears as a peacemaker in the group.

South African rapper Nadia Nakai who is in a long-distance relationship, and single guy and broadcaster Andile Ncube also feature as potential love interests of other cast members.

Twice-divorced South African Naked DJ and his footballer girlfriend Kayleigh Schwark go through the challenges of dating life and their 12-year age gap.

Cast
Annie Macaulay-Idibia
Diamond Platnumz
Swanky Jerry
Zari Hassan
Nadia Nakai
2Baba
Khanyi Mbau
Naked DJ
Kayleigh Schwark
Andile Ncube

Episodes

Season 1 (2022)

Production
On 22 June 2021, Netflix partnered with the creator and executive producer, Peace Hyde, to produce its first African reality series. On 25 September 2021, Netflix premiered Young, Famous & African at Tudum: A Global Fan Event in Brazil, among 60 Netflix Originals.

On 14 February 2022, the official trailer was released on Netflix's YouTube channel. The show premiered on 18 March.

Reception

Awards and nominations

References

External links
 
 Young, Famous & African at Netflix

2020s South African television series
2022 South African television series debuts
English-language Netflix original programming
South African reality television series
Television shows filmed in South Africa